Temsia is a rural commune of Morocco. It is located on the south bank of the Draa River in the prefecture of Inezgane-Aït Melloul in Souss-Massa region, 20 km southeast of Agadir, the regional capital. It borders Aït Melloul to the west, Lqliâa to the southwest, and the commune of Oulad Dahou to the east. National Route 10 runs through the main town of Temsia in the northern part of the commune, while Agadir–Al Massira Airport, the international airport that serves Agadir and the surrounding cities, is located in the southern part.

References

Populated places in Inezgane-Aït Melloul Prefecture
Rural communes of Souss-Massa